The Himalayan white-browed rosefinch (Carpodacus thura) is a true finch species (family Fringillidae).

Rages across the Himalayas, being found from Afghanistan in the west, eastwards across India to Tibet, Bhutan and Nepal. Its natural habitats are temperate forests and temperate shrubland.

References

External links
Images at ADW

Himalayan white-browed rosefinch
Birds of Afghanistan
Birds of the Himalayas
Birds of India
Himalayan white-browed rosefinch
Himalayan white-browed rosefinch
Taxonomy articles created by Polbot